Calvin Hall may refer to:

Calvin S. Hall (1909–1985), American psychologist
Calvin Hall (building), a building on the campus of Kansas State University

See also
Calvin Hill (born 1947), American football player